Element or elements may refer to:

Science
 Chemical element, a pure substance of one type of atom
 Heating element, a device that generates heat by electrical resistance
 Orbital elements, parameters required to identify a specific orbit of one body around another
 DNA element, a functional region of DNA, including genes and cis-regulatory elements

Mathematics
 Element (category theory)
 Element (mathematics), one of the constituents of a set
 Differential element, an infinitesimally small change of a quantity in an integral
 Euclid's Elements, a mathematical treatise on geometry and number theory
 An entry, or element, of a matrix.

Philosophy and religion
 Classical elements, ancient beliefs about the fundamental types of matter (earth, air, fire, water)
 The elements, a religious term referring to the bread and wine of the Eucharist
 Five elements (Japanese philosophy), the basis of the universe according to Japanese philosophy
 Mahābhūta, the four great elements in Buddhism, five in Hinduism
 Tattva, an elemental basis of the universe according to Hindu Samkhya philosophy
 Wuxing (Chinese philosophy), sometimes translated as five elements, the basis of the universe according to Chinese Taoin

Technology
 Element (UML), part of the Unified Modeling Language superstructure
 Data element, a unit of data
 Electrical element, an abstract part of a circuit
 HTML element, a standard part of an HTML document
 Markup element, a part of a document defined by a markup language
 Structural element, in construction and engineering
 Adobe Photoshop Elements, a bitmap graphics program
 Adobe Premiere Elements, a video editing computer program
 Honda Element, a car
 Element (software), a Matrix-based chat application formerly known as Riot

Business
 Element by Westin, a brand of Starwood Hotels and Resorts Worldwide
 Element Electronics, an American electronics company
 Element Skateboards, a skateboard manufacturer
 Elements (restaurant), in Princeton, New Jersey
 Elements, Hong Kong, a shopping mall in Hong Kong

Entertainment

Music
 Element (production team), a Norwegian production and songwriting team
 Elements (band), a 1980s–1990s American jazz band

Albums
 Elements (Atheist album) or the title song, 1993
 Elements (B.o.B album), 2016
 Elements (Elaine album), 2019
 Elements (Ludovico Einaudi album) or the title song, 2015
 Elements (Roger Glover album), 1978
 Elements (Steve Howe album), 2003
 Elements 1989–1990, by Carl Craig, 1996
 Elements Box by Mike Oldfield, four CD edition, 1993
 Elements – The Best of Mike Oldfield, single CD edition, 1993
 Elements – The Best of Mike Oldfield (video), 1993
 Elements, by A Band of Boys, 2002
 Elements, by Caliban, 2018
 Elements, by Sister Hazel, 2020
 Elements, an EP by Vicetone, 2019
 The Elements (Joe Henderson album), 1974
 The Elements (Second Person album), 2007
 The Elements (TobyMac album) or the title song, 2018

Songs
 "Element" (song), by Kendrick Lamar, 2017
 "Element", by Deerhunter from Why Hasn't Everything Already Disappeared?, 2019
 "Element", by Pop Smoke from Meet the Woo 2, 2020
 "Element", by Vision of Disorder from Vision of Disorder, 1996
 "Elements", by Matt Corby from Rainbow Valley, 2018
 "Elements", by Stratovarius from Elements Pt. 1, 2003
 "The Elements" (song), by Tom Lehrer, 1959
 "The Elements" (The Beach Boys song), 1966

Other entertainment
 Element Animation Ltd, a British Mojang-affiliated animation studio
 Elements (miniseries), a Cartoon Network miniseries
 Elements trilogy, three films written and directed by Deepa Mehta
 Elements (esports), a team in the European League of Legends Championship Series

Other
 Element (criminal law), a basic set of common law principles regarding criminal liability
 Elements (journal), a scientific publication about mineralogy, geochemistry, and petrology
 Element Magazine, Asian men's magazine
 Éléments, French political magazine
 Elementy, Russian political magazine (1992–2000)
The elements, a term used to refer to natural perils such as erosion, rough terrain, rust, cold, heat, and disastrous weather.

See also 
  and 
  and 
 Elemental (disambiguation)
 Elementary (disambiguation)
 Five elements (disambiguation)
 Fifth Element (disambiguation)